Hum Network Limited or Hum TV Network Limited is a Pakistani media company based in Karachi, Pakistan. It was established in February 2004 by Sultana Siddiqui.

It is a current member of Asia-Pacific Broadcasting Union (APBU), Association for International Broadcasting (AIB), and Commonwealth Broadcasting Association (CBA).

History 
Hum Network Limited was established in February 2004 with the name of Eye TV  Limited which was later changed to Eye Television Network Limited on 18 November 2004. The present name, Hum Network, was adopted on 21 January 2011.

Company is registered with Pakistan Electronic Media Regulatory Authority in October 2004 to operate its first satellite channel Hum TV which went live in January 2005. In June 2005, company made its public offering of company shares and is listed on the Pakistan Stock Exchange.

On 12 February 2013, during a press consultation at Hum Network head-office, 1st Hum Awards were announced in the presence of President Hum Network Sultana Siddiqui.

In September 2014, the Network launched Hum Films, a film production and distributor banner. First film which released under banner was Na Maloom Afraad which released domestically on 5 October 2014.

On 14 October 2014 Hum Network announced stock split from Rs 10 to Rs 1.

Hum Europe

Hum Europe is a British Pakistani Entertainment channel. It launched on 10 March 2014 FTA on BskyB. In December 2014 it was launched on Virgin Media. Soon after launching, in July 2014 the channel became the first Pakistani Entertainment channel to sign up to BARB.

Current programs

HUM Awards
HUM TV has its own awards. The 1st HUM Awards were held on 12 March 2015, encompassing 42 Nominations in 7 categories from 3 prominent fields. The Awards recognised and rewarded excellence in Pakistani Television, Fashion and Music.

Style360 Labels eStore
HUM Network created a strategic alliance with Labels eStore (an e-commerce website in Pakistan retailing clothing by Pakistani designers). The eStore is now called Style360Labels.

Brands

Magazines 
 BCW Fashion Catalogues
 Humsay
 Masala TV Food Magazine
 Newsline magazine
 Cook Books

Masala TV Food Mag 
Masala TV Food Mag a monthly Food recipe base magazine. Masala TV Food Mag is the only cooking magazine in Pakistan that has set a record of selling more than 70,000 copies. Even today, the magazine has the distinction of being a multi-issue magazine. The magazine was launched in January 2009 and has been successfully published ever since. Sultana Siddiqui is the Editor-in-Chief of Masala TV Food Magazine. In addition to the authoritative recipes of Hum Masala's chefs in this magazine, also include the most useful and authoritative articles.

TV Channels Pakistan
 Hum TV HD (Pakistan & South Asia)
 Hum Sitaray
 Hum News
 Hum Masala
 Hum Pashto 1

International Channels

 Hum Europe (Europe)
 Hum World HD (United States)
Hum Mena (Middle East & North Africa)

Shut Down Channels

 Hum Style 360
 Hum Tv 2
 Hum OYO Music

Online Retailer 
 Hum Mart
HumMart is a variant of the bigger Hum Network Limited based currently in Karachi, Pakistan. It is an online retailer, focusing on grocery shopping and providing its users with home delivery of online placed order. HumMart was launched on 20 April 2018 by Mr Malik Faisal Qayyum and Duraid Qureshi.

Others 
 Hum Awards
 Hum Style Awards
 Hum Films
 Masala Family Festival
 Hum women's awards

References

External links 
 

 
Companies listed on the Pakistan Stock Exchange
Mass media companies of Pakistan
Television companies of Pakistan
Companies based in Karachi
Mass media companies established in 2004
Companies of Sindh